KENTORT II is an above-ground shale oil extraction process developed by the Center for Applied Energy Research of the University of Kentucky. It is a hot recycled solids fluidized bed retorting process developed since 1982 for processing the eastern United States Devonian oil shales. The concept of this process was initiated in 1986 in the test unit.

The KENTORT II retort consists of four fluidized bed vessels, configured in cascade. The raw oil shale is fed to the pyrolysis vessel the pyrolysis section, where it is fluidized by a mixture of steam and product oil shale gas from the gasification section below. Heat is transferred to the raw oil shale by a combination of fluidizing gas and recirculating hot spent shale from the gasification section.

The pyrolyzed oil shale moves by gravity downward to the gasification section. Steam from the cooling zone is used for fluidizing the sent shale while heat transferred by hot solids (oil shale ash) from the combustion section. The spent shale moves to the combustion section where it is burnt to heat the process, while oil shale ash moves to the cooling section before its removal from the retort.

See also
 Galoter process
 Alberta Taciuk Process
 Petrosix process
 Kiviter process
 TOSCO II process
 Fushun process
 Paraho process
 Lurgi-Ruhrgas process
 Chevron STB process
 LLNL HRS process

References

Oil shale technology
Thermal treatment